Mount Middleton is a settlement in New Brunswick.

History

Notable people
Marg Hanrahan

See also
List of communities in New Brunswick

References

Communities in Kings County, New Brunswick
Settlements in New Brunswick